José Manuel González López (born 26 May 1943) is a Spanish former professional footballer who played as a defender.

Career
He spent the first two years of his senior career with Segunda División side Granada, making forty appearances in that period; including his debut against Hércules in November 1964. Granada were promoted in his final campaign, finishing 2nd in 1965–66. Prior to the 1966–67 La Liga season, González joined fellow top-flight team Real Zaragoza. Like with Granada, his first appearance for Zaragoza came versus Hércules; with his new side winning 2–0. He featured one hundred and sixty-six times in his opening five seasons with the club, with the latter campaign ending with relegation to the 1971–72 Segunda División.

In that season, Zaragoza won instant promotion back to La Liga with González participating in twenty-seven fixtures whilst also netting his first senior goal; during a home victory over Tenerife. He remained with Zaragoza for a further five seasons, taking his overall appearance tally to three hundred and seventy-four across eleven years. He departed in 1977, joining former club Granada but failed to make an appearance before retiring.

Personal life
González's father and namesake Manuel González was also a professional footballer. Lucas Alcaraz is a nephew, he became a football manager in 1995.

Career statistics

References

External links

1943 births
Footballers from Granada
Spanish footballers
Association football defenders
Segunda División players
La Liga players
Granada CF footballers
Real Zaragoza players
Living people